Requiem is a 2006 German drama film directed by Hans-Christian Schmid. It stars Sandra Hüller as a woman with epilepsy, Michaela Klingler, believed by members of her church and herself to be possessed. The film steers clear of special effects or dramatic music and instead presents documentary-style film making, which focuses on Michaela's struggle to lead a normal life, trapped in a limbo which could either represent demonic possession or mental illness, focusing on the latter.

The film focuses on the medical condition (epilepsy) as seen in the real-life events of Anneliese Michel, a German woman who was allegedly possessed by six or more demons and died in 1976. These events also served as the basis of Scott Derrickson's 2005 film The Exorcism of Emily Rose.

Plot

Cast 
 Sandra Hüller as Michaela Klingler
 Burghart Klaußner as Karl Klingler
 Imogen Kogge as Marianne Klingler
 Anna Blomeier as Hanna Imhof
 Nicholas Reinke as Stefan Weiser
 Jens Harzer as Martin Borchert
 Walter Schmidinger as Gerhard Landauer 
 Friederike Adolph as Helga Klingler
 Irene Kugler as Heimleiterin Krämer
 Johann Adam Oest as Professor Schneider

Release

Home media
In the US, Requiem was released as a region 1 DVD in 2007.

Critical reception
On review aggregator website Rotten Tomatoes, the film holds an approval rating of 86% based on 35 reviews, and an average rating of 7.4/10. The website's critical consensus reads, "This harrowing, naturalistic drama holds you in its grip through Huller's intense performance." On Metacritic, the film has a weighted average score of 82 out of 100, based on 13 critics, indicating "universal acclaim".

References

External links
 

2006 drama films
2006 films
2006 horror films
Films about exorcism
Films directed by Hans-Christian Schmid
Films set in the 1970s
German drama films
2000s German-language films
2000s German films